Eshaya "Shay" Murphy (born April 15, 1985) is an American professional basketball player.

Born in Canoga Park, California, Murphy attended college at USC and graduated in 2007. Following her collegiate career, she was selected 15th overall in the 2007 WNBA Draft by the Minnesota Lynx. Murphy has a brother George who attend the same high school as her.

The rookie played a reserve role for the Lynx in 2007, averaging 5.2 points and 3.3 rebounds per game. On June 22, 2008, Murphy was traded to the Detroit Shock for LaToya Thomas. On August 12, 2008, Murphy was traded along with Tasha Humphrey to the Washington Mystics for Taj McWilliams-Franklin. After being waived by the Mystics, the Indiana Fever signed her on June 11, 2009.
She then played for the Chicago Sky, being signed halfway through the 2011 season.

Murphy signed with Ros Casares Valencia of Euroleague Women for the 2011–2012 season, helping them to win the championship in her Euroleague rookie season. On season 2012–2013 she moved to Galatasaray. On 2013, she moved back to Spain signing with Perfumerias Avenida. In 2014, she signed with the Phoenix Mercury and won a WNBA championship with the team. In 2017, the Mercury would re-acquire Murphy in free agency. During the 2017 season, Murphy was traded to the San Antonio Stars.

WNBA career statistics

Regular season

|-
| align="left" | 2007
| align="left" | Minnesota
| 32 || 0 || 13.6 || .372 || .273 || .848 || 3.3 || 0.5 || 0.6 || 0.3 || 0.6 || 5.2
|-
| align="left" | 2008
| align="left" | Minnesota
| 2 || 0 || 2.5 || .200 || .000 || .000 || 1.0 || 0.0 || 0.0 || 0.0 || 0.0 || 1.0
|-
| align="left" | 2008
| align="left" | Detroit
| 13 || 3 || 9.4 || .300 || .263 || .667 || 1.6 || 0.5 || 0.5 || 0.2 || 0.7 || 2.5
|-
| align="left" | 2008
| align="left" | Washington
| 2 || 0 || 5.5 || .333 || .000 || .000 || 1.5 || 0.5 || 0.0 || 0.0 || 1.0 || 1.0
|-
| align="left" | 2009
| align="left" | Indiana
| 24 || 0 || 7.8 || .382 || .344 || .808 || 1.8 || 0.4 || 0.3 || 0.1 || 0.4 || 4.2
|-
| align="left" | 2010
| align="left" | Indiana
| 15 || 1 || 14.7 || .350 || .263 || .571 || 4.1 || 1.5 || 0.5 || 0.1 || 1.2 || 5.1
|-
| align="left" | 2010
| align="left" | Chicago
| 11 || 0 || 14.1 || .288 || .286 || .667 || 1.8 || 0.8 || 0.8 || 0.0 || 1.0 || 5.1
|-
| align="left" | 2011
| align="left" | Chicago
| 10 || 0 || 20.5 || .369 || .400 || .929 || 4.8 || 1.1 || 1.3 || 0.4 || 1.9 || 9.8
|-
| align="left" | 2012
| align="left" | Chicago
| 29 || 3 || 18.6 || .420 || .441 || .730 || 2.9 || 0.9 || 1.1 || 0.2 || 1.0 || 8.5
|-
| align="left" | 2013
| align="left" | Chicago
| 34 || 0 || 11.1 || .292 || .172 || .792 || 1.9 || 0.3 || 0.6 || 0.0 || 0.4 || 3.1
|-
|style="text-align:left;background:#afe6ba;"|  2014†
| align="left" | Phoenix
| 27 || 1 || 12.1 || .424 || .323 || .750 || 1.7 || 1.1 || 0.7 || 0.1 || 0.3 || 3.9
|-
| align="left" | 2017
| align="left" | Phoenix
| 9 || 0 || 14.1 || .333 || .188 || .667 || 2.4 || 0.8 || 0.7 || 0.0 || 0.6 || 3.2
|-
| align="left" | 2017
| align="left" | San Antonio
| 17 || 0 || 7.4 || .400 || .450 || .667 || 0.9 || 0.6 || 0.2 || 0.1 || 0.4 || 2.2
|-
| align="left" | Career
| align="left" | 9 years, 7 teams
| 225 || 8 || 12.6 || .366 || .321 || .762 || 2.4 || 0.7 || 0.6 || 0.1 || 0.7 || 4.7

Regular season

|-
| align="left" | 2009
| align="left" | Indiana
| 4 || 0 || 2.3 || .000 || .000 || .000 || 0.5 || 0.3 || 0.0 || 0.0 || 0.0 || 0.0
|-
| align="left" | 2013
| align="left" | Chicago
| 2 || 0 || 8.0 || .500 || 1.000 || .000 || 1.5 || 0.5 || 0.0 || 0.0 || 0.0 || 1.5
|-
|style="text-align:left;background:#afe6ba;"|  2014†
| align="left" | Phoenix
| 7 || 0 || 7.3 || .273 || .250 || .000 || 1.4 || 0.4 || 0.3 || 0.0 || 0.6 || 1.0
|-
| align="left" | Career
| align="left" | 3 years, 3 teams
| 13 || 0 || 5.8 || .222 || .286 || .000 || 1.2 || 0.4 || 0.2 || 0.0 || 0.3 || 0.8

USC statistics

Source

References

External links
WNBA Player Profile
WNBA Prospect Profile
Murphy traded to the Detroit Shock
Murphy traded to the Washington Mystics

1985 births
Living people
Montenegrin women's basketball players
American women's basketball players
American emigrants to Montenegro
American expatriate basketball people in Spain
American expatriate basketball people in Turkey
Basketball players from California
Chicago Sky players
Detroit Shock players
Galatasaray S.K. (women's basketball) players
Indiana Fever players
Minnesota Lynx draft picks
Minnesota Lynx players
Montenegrin people of African-American descent
Naturalized citizens of Montenegro
Phoenix Mercury players
Ros Casares Valencia players
San Antonio Stars players
Shooting guards
USC Trojans women's basketball players
Washington Mystics players
Montclair College Preparatory School alumni